"Doin' Just Fine" is a song performed by American contemporary R&B group Boyz II Men. It is the opening track on their third studio album Evolution and serves as the album's fourth and final single. Written and produced by group member Shawn Stockman, it peaked at number 33 on the Billboard R&B/Hip-Hop Airplay chart.

Music video

The official music video for "Doin' Just Fine" was directed by Christopher Erskin 
The location of the video is Portland Jamaica all locations. The video depicts the various members going through breakups, but ultimately "doing just fine" as the lyrics suggest while they sing reflective lyrics about their relationships.

References

External links
 
 

1997 songs
1998 singles
Boyz II Men songs
Motown singles
Music videos directed by Christopher Erskin
Song recordings produced by Shawn Stockman
Songs written by Shawn Stockman